Jesús Hernández Úbeda (11 October 1959 – 23 April 1996) was a Spanish professional racing cyclist. He rode in five editions of the Tour de France and ten editions of the Vuelta a España.

References

External links

1959 births
1996 deaths
Spanish male cyclists
Cyclists from Madrid